Prądniczanka Kraków (Klub Sportowy Prądniczanka Kraków) is a Polish football club based in Prądnik Czerwony district of Kraków. They currently play in the Polish regional league, the sixth tier of the Polish football league.

It is a multi-sport club, in addition to the football section (both men and women), it also has basketball and volleyball sections.

History 

Prądniczanka Kraków dates its foundation to 1921, to the merger of two clubs, "Wezuwiusz" and "Zadworze". Initially the club remained under the name "Wezuwiusz", but in 1924 it was renamed as "Klub Sportowy Prądniczanka".

Squad

Notable players

 Władysław Kawula
 Antoni Łyko
 Mirosław Szymkowiak

Current coaching staff

Sources:

References

External links 
 

Football clubs in Kraków
Football clubs in Poland
Association football clubs established in 1921
1921 establishments in Poland